Vice-Admiral Sir Francis Mason KCB (born 1779) was a senior Royal Navy officer who temporarily commanded the Mediterranean Fleet from October 1841 to April 1842.

Naval career
Mason joined the Royal Navy on 23 May 1793. He took part in the action of 28 May 1794, the action of 29 May 1794 and the Glorious First of June. He was given command of the sloop  in December 1803. Promoted to post-captain he commanded, successively, the post ship , in which he took part in the Walcheren Campaign in 1809, the fifth-rate , and the fifth-rate , in which he took part in the siege of San Sebastián in 1813.  He went on to command, successively, the fifth-rate  and the fifth-rate . He temporarily commanded the South America Station from July 1834 to September 1834 and temporarily commanded the Mediterranean Fleet from October 1841 to April 1842. He retired as a Vice-admiral of the White.

References

1779 births
Royal Navy vice admirals
Knights Commander of the Order of the Bath
Year of death missing